Hong Kong participated at the 2018 Asian Para Games which was held in Jakarta, Indonesia from 6 to 13 October 2018.

The Hong Kong delegation was composed of 101 athletes who participated in 10 out of 18 sports in the games which were Archery, Athletics, Badminton, Boccia, Bowling, Lawn bowls, Table tennis, Shooting, Swimming, and Wheelchair fencing, with Ng Chak Lin served as the head of the delegation.

Medalists

Medals by sport

Medals by day

See also 
 Hong Kong at the 2018 Asian Games

References 

Nations at the 2018 Asian Para Games
Hong Kong at the Asian Para Games
2018 in Hong Kong sport